Bujaraloz is a municipality located in the province of Zaragoza, Aragon, Spain. According to the 2004 census (INE), the municipality has a population of 1,002 inhabitants.

See also
Monegros
List of municipalities in Zaragoza

References

External links 

Bujaraloz; official municipal webpage.

Municipalities in the Province of Zaragoza